The 1930 FA Cup final was contested by Arsenal and Huddersfield Town at Wembley Stadium. Arsenal won 2–0, with goals from Alex James and Jack Lambert. As a result, Arsenal won their first FA Cup after a defeat in their FA Cup final debut in 1927.

Background
The 1930 Final was the first Cup Final in which both teams entered the pitch side by side, in honour of Arsenal manager Herbert Chapman, who had also managed Huddersfield in the 1920s.

Arsenal came into the game following a 6–6 draw at Leicester City, the highest-scoring draw in English top-flight history, five days prior. Dave Halliday, who scored four of Arsenal's goals that game, was omitted from the Cup Final squad in favour of Jack Lambert.

The 1930 FA Cup Final is remembered for the Graf Zeppelin passing over the stadium at the start of the second half. The Zeppelin was, at the time, the largest airship ever and was around 776 ft in length.

After first being broadcast on BBC Radio in 1928, the 1930 final was the first for which a fee was paid for the rights.

Arsenal's Bill Seddon, who died in January 1993 at the age of 91, was the last surviving player to appear in the game.

Road to the Final

Arsenal

Huddersfield Town

Match details

References

External links
FA Cup Final lineups
FA Cup Final kits 1930–39

FA Cup Finals
FA Cup Final
FA Cup Final 1930
FA Cup Final 1930
FA Cup Final
FA Cup Final